Warren Street is a London Underground station, located at the intersection of Tottenham Court Road and Euston Road and named after adjoining Warren Street. It is part of the Northern and Victoria lines and although it is relatively used less than a number of neighbouring stations, it provides an interchange between these two lines as well as access to University College Hospital.

The station opened in 1907 as Euston Road, and was designed by Leslie Green. It was refurbished in the 1930s by Charles Holden, when escalators were first installed. An extensive refurbishment took place in the late 1960s to accommodate the Victoria line, when it briefly acted as a temporary terminus. It was the first station on the underground to have a dedicated Wi-Fi surface in 2012.

Name and location
The premises adjoins Warren Street, Euston Road and Tottenham Court Road; Warren Street is named after the 18th-century naval officer Sir Peter Warren. It is in Travelcard Zone 1 and is the nearest tube station to University College Hospital, being opposite the main building.

London Buses routes 18, 24, 27, 29, 30, 73, 134, 205 and 390 and night routes N5, N20, N29, N73, N205, N253 and N279 serve the station.

The station has a relatively low footfall for Victoria line stations in the area. In 2020, the annualised total for Warren Street was around 7.7 million, lower than Euston (8.8 million), Green Park (9.4 million), Oxford Circus (14.6 million), Kings Cross St Pancras (18.8 million) and Victoria (23 million).

History

Northern line
The station was part of the original Charing Cross, Euston and Hampstead Railway, running from Charing Cross to Camden Town. Work started on the station in 1902, designed by Leslie Green. It was opened along with the rest of the line on 22 June 1907 by the President of the Board of Trade, David Lloyd George, under the name "Euston Road". This name can still be seen in the Northern line platform tiling. The station's name changed to "Warren Street" the following year, on 7 June 1908.

In the early 1930s, Charles Holden designed a refurbishment for the station, including the surface building. In September 1933, the station was rebuilt, with escalators installed in place of the original lifts. Tripod gates were fitted to the station entrance in July 1968.

Victoria line
Warren Street was not in the original proposals for the Victoria line, but was added by the time work began in 1962. This was done to break up a lengthy section of tube between Euston and Oxford Circus, and provide an additional public transport access point to the local area.

The Victoria platforms opened on 1 December 1968 as a temporary southern terminus of the line. Trains ran into the southbound platform and reversed; the northbound platform was not originally used. The interchange with the Northern Line was cumbersome as it involved a staircase and two escalators. The extension southwards towards Victoria officially opened on 7 March 1969, though through trains had been running since 24 February. Along with other Victoria line stations, the new complex was originally decorated with tiles showing an illustration relating to the station's name – in this case, a maze (signifying a warren).

Later history
On 27 April 2012, Warren Street station became the first London Underground Wi-Fi enabled tube station.

Incidents
On 23 November 1984, a fire broke out in a maintenance compound near Oxford Circus. The Victoria line was part-suspended, with trains terminating at Warren Street. The line reopened on 17 December. The fire was believed to be caused by a discarded cigarette, which led to a smoking ban on all below-ground components of the Underground, including trains, platforms and stations.

On 23 July 2018, a woman died after being hit by a train at the station. The police did not believe there were any suspicious circumstances.

Warren Street tube station was attacked in the 2005 London Bombings. There were no fatalities in this attack.

Cultural references
The Northern line northbound platform of the station was used for location filming in the 1972 horror film Death Line, featuring a group of cannibals living underground.

Gallery

References
Notes

Citations

Sources

External links

 London Transport Museum Photographic Archive
 
 
 

Northern line stations
Victoria line stations
London Underground Night Tube stations
Former Charing Cross, Euston and Hampstead Railway stations
Tube stations in the London Borough of Camden
Railway stations in Great Britain opened in 1907
Charles Holden railway stations
Buildings and structures on Tottenham Court Road